The  is a  railway line in Japan operated by the private railway company Tobu Railway. It branches from Tōbu Dōbutsu Kōen Station in Miyashiro, Saitama on the Skytree Line, extending north to Tōbu Nikkō Station in Nikkō, Tochigi.

The line has two branch lines: the Utsunomiya Line at Shin-Tochigi Station in Tochigi, Tochigi, and the Kinugawa Line at Shimo-Imaichi Station in Nikkō.

Service patterns
, stops and service patterns are
 : Stops at all stations on the Nikko Line. Through to/from Naka-Meguro on the Tokyo Metro Hibiya Line;
 : Stops at all stations on the Nikko Line, limited-stop service on the Skytree Line;
 : Stops at all stations on the Nikko Line, limited-stop service on the Skytree Line. Through to/from Chūō-Rinkan on the Tokyu Den-en-toshi Line via the Tokyo Metro Hanzomon Line;
 : Stops at all stations on the Nikko Line, limited-stop service on the Skytree Line;
 : Stops at all stations on the Nikko Line, express service on the Skytree Line. Through to/from Chūō-Rinkan on the Tokyu Den-en-toshi Line via the Tokyo Metro Hanzomon Line.
 : Stops at partly stations on the Nikko Line, Limited express also services on the Skytree Line. There are Limited Express which are 4 types of ・・・. Trains which are named KINU or KINUGAWA bound to Kinugawaonsen Station. Trains which are named KEGON or NIKKO, KIRIFURI bound to Tobu-Nikko Station. Trains which are named AIZU bound to Aizu-Tajima Station. 
 : Stops at Tobu-Nikko and Shimo-Imaichi. Passengers riding on this train must purchase the package on Tobu Top Tours and so on. Runs once a month.

Stations

Notes:
 O: Stop
 |: Non-stop
 4: Terminating Services from 
 5: Partly Services stop at the stations
 A: to/from 
 C: to/from 
 S: to/from  when named as JR

History
The Nikko Line opened (dual track and electrified) on 1 October 1929.

In 1943, the section north of Kassemba was reduced to single track and the recovered rails used to build the Tobu Kumagaya Line.

Electric limited express services first started operating from February 1949. From October 1960, new 1720 series "Deluxe Romance car" EMUs were introduced on limited express services to and from Nikko.

From 1 June 1990, new 100 series "Spacia" EMUs were introduced on limited express services, and the maximum speed of these was raised to 120 km/h in 1992.

From 17 March 2012, station numbering was introduced on all Tobu lines, with Tobu Nikko Line stations adopting the prefix "TN" in orange.

The former Skytree Train and 300 series limited express trains, Rapid, and Section Rapid services were discontinued from the start of the revised timetable on 21 April 2017.

See also
 List of railway lines in Japan

References

External links

  

Nikko Line
Rail transport in Saitama Prefecture
Rail transport in Gunma Prefecture
Rail transport in Tochigi Prefecture
1067 mm gauge railways in Japan
Railway lines opened in 1929